Carlos Juan Cintrón Figueroa (6 September 1918 – 5 May 1998) was mayor of Ponce, Puerto Rico from 1957 to 1961.  However, in year 1960, during a period while Cintron held his post as mayor, Helvetia Nicole filled in as interim mayor. After his tenure as mayor, Cintrón was president of Puerto Rico's Unión de Trabajadores de Acero (United Steelworkers of America).

Personal life
Cintron Figueroa was born in Barrio Callabos, Juana Diaz, Puerto Rico. He was the son of Luis Cintron Rodriguez and Rosa Maria Figueroa Nazario. He had a brother, 2 years older than him, named Carlos Luis. Cintrón Figueroa married Josefina Fernandez Reyes on 22 May 1936, and fathered seven children (Carlos Juan, Rosa Margarita, Lillian, Enrique, Luis, and Lombardo), in this first marriage. Josefina Fernandez Reyes was Ponce's First Lady during Cintron's tenure as mayor. After his divorce from Fernandez Reyes, he married Rosa Gonzalez from which relationship his seventh child, Brenda, was born.

Carlos Juan Cintron died on May 5, 1998 in Ponce, Puerto Rico at age 79.

See also

 List of Puerto Ricans
 List of mayors of Ponce, Puerto Rico

References

Further reading
 Fay Fowlie de Flores. Ponce, Perla del Sur: Una Bibliográfica Anotada. Second Edition. 1997. Ponce, Puerto Rico: Universidad de Puerto Rico en Ponce. p. 173. Item 880. 
 Carnaval de Ponce: programa. Ponce, Puerto Rico. 196x? - . Includes photos. (Archivo Histórico Municipal de Ponce, AHMP; Colegio Universitario Tecnológico de Ponce, CUTPO)

1918 births
1998 deaths
Mayors of Ponce, Puerto Rico
People from Juana Díaz, Puerto Rico
United Steelworkers people